The Aero Boero 260AG is an Argentine agricultural aircraft that first flew in 1973. Despite the similarity in designation, it is completely different from and unrelated to the Aero Boero AB-260.

The 260AG is a low-wing monoplane with a single seat and fixed tailwheel undercarriage. Development commenced in 1971 as the AG.235/260, but various problems forced the project to stagnate and it was not revived until the 1990s.

Specifications (AG.235/260)

See also

References 
Notes

Bibliography

External links 
 260AG – Official site
 Aero Boero 260AG at Flickr!
 Aero Boero 260AG at Flickr!

260AG
1970s Argentine agricultural aircraft
Single-engined tractor aircraft
Low-wing aircraft
Aircraft first flown in 1972